The Royal Decree of Graces of 1815 (Spanish: Real Cédula de Gracias) is a legal order approved by the Spanish Crown in the early half of the 19th century to encourage Spaniards and, later, Europeans of non-Spanish origin, to settle in and populate the colony of Puerto Rico.

Royal Decree of Graces
On 10 August 1815, King Ferdinand VII of Spain approved the Spanish Royal Decree of Graces, which granted Puerto Rico the right to have commercial ties with countries which were in good standing with Spain. It also granted free land to settlers, as well as incentives for investing money and providing technology for agricultural development to any Spaniard willing to relocate and settle in those territories.

Puerto Rico was largely undeveloped until 1830, when immigrants from the Spanish provinces of Catalonia, Majorca, and the Canary Islands began to arrive. They gradually developed the sugarcane, coffee, and tobacco plantations, based on the use of African slave labor. Spain had approved Decree of Graces of 8 September 1777 in regard to Venezuela, and the Decree of Graces of 1789, which granted its subjects the right to purchase slaves and to participate in the flourishing business of slave trading in the Caribbean.

Situation in the Spanish Colonies
At the beginning of the 19th century, the Spanish colonies in the Western Hemisphere fought for their independence. In South America, Simón Bolívar and José de San Martín led colonists to victory against Spanish rule; in Mexico, José María Morelos led the movement.

By 1825, the Spanish Empire had lost control of all of its territories in the Americas with the exception of Puerto Rico and Cuba. These two possessions were also demanding more autonomy, and pro-independence movements had been gathering strength. Trying to forestall the loss of these colonies, the Spanish Crown revived the Royal Decree of Graces of 1815. It printed the decree in English and French, as well as Spanish, and distributed copies throughout Europe to attract non-Spanish settlers. The Crown offered free land on the condition that new settlers swear their loyalty to the Spanish Crown and allegiance to the Roman Catholic Church. They hoped to supplant the independence movement with new settlers.

Situation in Europe
During the latter part of the 18th century and the beginning of the 19th century, great economic and political changes occurred in Europe. Thousands of farm workers migrated to cities seeking industrial jobs and better opportunities. Those who stayed behind to attend the farmlands suffered the widespread crop failures, brought on by long periods of drought and diseases such as the potato fungus which contributed to the Great Famine of the 1840s.  Cholera epidemics broke out and starvation was widespread in Europe. Social and economic disruption also followed the European Revolutions of 1848, which erupted in Sicily and the German states. The French Revolution of 1848 contributed to the Franco-Prussian war of 1870 and more changes.

These conditions led to a massive European immigration to the Americas. Hundreds of Corsicans, Italians, French, Portuguese, Irish, Scots, and Germans, attracted by the offers of free land by the Spanish Crown, moved to the colony of Puerto Rico and accepted the conditions. As soon as these settlers swore their loyalty to the Spanish Crown and their allegiance to the Roman Catholic Church, they were given a "Letter of Domicile". After five years, the settlers were granted a "Letter of Naturalization" that made them Spanish subjects. In 1870, to attract non-Catholic Europeans, Spain's Cortes of Cádiz passed a law granting the right of religious freedom in the islands.

Aftermath
The new settlers soon adopted the language and customs of their new homelands, and many intermarried with the local residents. Many became prominent business and political leaders. The Royal Decree continued in effect until 1898, when Spain finally lost Puerto Rico and Cuba, its last two possessions in the New World, to the United States under the Treaty of Paris that ended the Spanish–American War.

The original Spanish Royal Decree of Graces of 1815 is kept in the General Archives of Puerto Rico in the Institute of Puerto Rican Culture in San Juan, Puerto Rico.

See also

Corsican immigration to Puerto Rico
French immigration to Puerto Rico
German immigration to Puerto Rico
Irish immigration to Puerto Rico
Spanish immigration to Puerto Rico

References

External links
Real Cédula de 1789 "para el comercio de Negros"
Archivo General de Puerto Rico: Documentos
Real Cédula del 8 de setiembre de 1777

Colonial Puerto Rico
Spanish colonial period of Cuba
Social history of Puerto Rico
History of the Caribbean
Spanish West Indies
1815 in Spain
1815 in North America
1815 in Puerto Rico
1815 in Cuba
1815 in the Spanish West Indies
Decrees